The Platte River is a tributary of the Mississippi River in central Minnesota in the United States. Platte is a name derived from the French meaning "flat".

Course
The Platte flows from Platte Lake in southeastern Crow Wing County and follows a generally southwestward course through eastern Morrison County, through the towns of Harding and Royalton.

The Platte's largest tributary is the Skunk River, which joins it in Morrison County.

See also
List of rivers of Minnesota

References

External links
 Waters, Thomas F. (1977).  The Streams and Rivers of Minnesota.  Minneapolis: University of Minnesota Press.  .

Rivers of Minnesota
Rivers of Benton County, Minnesota
Rivers of Crow Wing County, Minnesota
Rivers of Morrison County, Minnesota
Tributaries of the Mississippi River